Mount View High School is a government-funded co-educational comprehensive secondary day school, located in West Cessnock, in the Hunter Region of New South Wales, Australia.

Established in 1985, the school enrolled approximately 952 students in 2021, from Year 7 to Year 12, of whom 19 percent identified as Indigenous Australians and three percent were from a language background other than English. The school is operated by the NSW Department of Education; the principal is Shane Hookway.

Overview 
The school provides the school certificate in Year 10 and the NSW Higher School Certificate (HSC) in Year 12.

The school conducts a working vineyard and the P&C sells the wine to the public to raise funds.

F1 in Schools program 
Mount View High School has had major successes in the F1 in Schools program, winning the NSW state finals in 2016 with 'Revolution Racing' and in 2017 with 'Pentessellate', with each team going on to place fourth at the national finals in their respective winning seasons. In 2017 'Revolution Racing' collaborated with 'Instant Transmission' a team from Queechy High School to form 'Envisity' and compete at the world finals where they placed 14th.

See also 

 List of government schools in New South Wales
 Education in Australia

References

External links
 
 NSW Schools website

Public high schools in New South Wales
City of Cessnock
Educational institutions established in 1985
1985 establishments in Australia